Louis Awad   (el-Minya; 5 January 1915 – 9 September 1990) was an Egyptian intellectual and a writer.

Born in the upper Egypt, in Sharuna village, in Minya, Egypt, Awad studied at the literature department of Cairo University before setting off to England for further studies before the Second World War. He returned to Egypt in 1941, after which he lived in the Cairo district of Dokki for much of his adult life.

He studied literature at Cairo University, Cambridge University, and Princeton University. In 1947 he was a professor of English at Cairo University and published a revolutionary collection of poems called Plotoland (also spelled Plutoland) wherein he introduced free verse forms to Egyptian literature and presented a scathing attack on traditionalism in poetry.

He was the first Egyptian chairman of the English Department (Faculty of Letters) at Cairo University and while there, he encouraged students to listen to classical music. 
When surrealism in art reached Egypt, he didn't denounce it but was quoted as saying, "“Whatever we think about the originality of this art form in Egypt, it was good at dealing a death blow to academism.”

From 1945 to 1950 he joined with other writers who drew from Marxism and other sources in a call for the total reform of Egyptian society. He attended talks by Taha Hussein with Denys Johnson-Davies. He was outspoken in his wish for "democratization and secularism in the Arab world" and he is celebrated in Egypt for having been a contemporary thinker.

Awad's unwavering critical stance continued after the 1952 revolution. As a consequence, he suffered the humiliation of being forced to resign his position at Cairo University in 1954. In 1976, he wrote about the revolution in The Seven Masks of Nasserism: Discussing Heikal and Tawfik Al-Hakim.

Awad became the literary editor at the newspaper al-Ahram-the largest daily newspaper of the Middle East making him one of the leading opinion-makers in the Arab world.

See also 
List of Copts 
Lists of Egyptians

References

External links
 The permanent revolution: From Cairo to Paris with the Egyptian surrealists by Fatenn Mostafa Kanafani 11/11/2016

Egyptian people of Coptic descent
Egyptian literary critics
1915 births
1990 deaths
Cairo University alumni
Alumni of King's College, Cambridge
Princeton University alumni
People from Minya Governorate
Academic staff of Cairo University